Down River may refer to:
 Down River (1931 film), a British crime film
 Down River (2013 film), a Canadian drama film

See also
 Downriver, a region located in Wayne County, Michigan
 Downriver (film), a 2015 Australian film